Mahmood Shafqat (also spelled Mahmoud Shafqat) was a Pakistani diplomat. He served as Chairman of UNICEF from 1957 to 1958.

He served at the Permanent Mission of Pakistan to the United Nations in New York during the 1950s and 1960s, including as Alternate Permanent Representative. He later served as Pakistan's Ambassador to Algeria, Poland and France from 1974. He was also Pakistan's Permanent Delegate to UNESCO from 1974 to 1976.

References

Chairmen and Presidents of UNICEF
Year of birth missing
Year of death missing
Ambassadors of Pakistan to Algeria
Ambassadors of Pakistan to France
Ambassadors of Pakistan to Poland
Permanent Delegates of Pakistan to UNESCO
Pakistani officials of the United Nations